Shreepur  is a Village Development Committee in Mahottari District in the Janakpur Zone of south-eastern Nepal. At the time of the 1991 Nepal census it had a population of 7666 people residing in 1472 individual households.

References

External links
UN map of the municipalities of Mahottari District

Populated places in Mahottari District